Gallery is the debut studio album by German band from Berlin Elaiza. It was released in Germany on 28 March 2014. The album has peaked to number 24 on the German Albums Chart. The album includes the single "Is it Right".

Singles
 "Is it Right" was released as the lead single from the album on 28 February 2014. The song has peaked to number 2 in Germany. The song was selected to represent Germany at the Eurovision Song Contest 2014 at the B&W Hallerne in Copenhagen, Denmark. During the German delegation's press conference on 6 May 2014, Germany was allocated to compete in the first half of the final. In the final, the producers of the show decided that Germany would perform 12th, following Austria and preceding Sweden. On stage, the members of Elaiza performed alone with band members Yvonne Grünwald playing the accordion, Natalie Plöger playing the contrabass and Ela Steinmetz performing lead vocal. The German performance featured paper streamers that fall over the stage during the first and last chorus. The song finished 18th in the final with 39 points.

Track listing

Critical reception and Chart performance
The album has received positive reviews since their Eurovision participation so far. Rory Gannon of ESC Views gave a positive review of the album, saying that there is a "nice balance between folk and pop" and how "it shows Ela's roots in a way that you know where she's from but she's also not rubbing it in your face.". Sergiusz Królak of JazzSoul.pl claimed, that album is "full of catchy-pop songs (...) with catchy melody and not a stupid lyrics".

Weekly charts

Release history

References

2014 albums